The Daily World is the name of various newspapers:

The Daily World (Aberdeen), Washington
Atlanta Daily World
Greene County (Indiana) Daily World
Daily World (Opelousas), Louisiana
The Vancouver Daily World
Atlantic City Daily World

See also
World (disambiguation)#Periodicals